Apamea helva, the yellow three-spot, is a moth of the  family Noctuidae. It is found from Saskatchewan to New Brunswick, south to Georgia, and west to Oklahoma and Colorado.

Description
The wingspan is 35–41 mm. Adults are on wing from July to September depending on the location.

The larvae feed on various grasses.

External links
Images
Apamea helva, Bug Guide

Apamea (moth)
Moths of North America
Moths described in 1875
Taxa named by Augustus Radcliffe Grote